Defrosting or defroster may refer to:

Defrosting (refrigeration)
Frozen food#Defrosting
 De-icing
 Defogger